Atheist Like Me is Taiwanese Mandopop artist Stanley Huang's 5th Mandarin studio album. It was released on 5 January 2007 by EMI Music Taiwan.

Two versions were released  including Atheist Like Me (Second Version) (無神論 影音慶功版) containing with a DVD of footages from 2007 Stanley Huang 「Atheist Like Me」 Intel Core Duo Live Tour (黃立行「無神論」Intel雙核飛舞Live Tour精華) and also with four music videos.

Track listing
打分數 (Da Fen Shu) - What Number Are You? - 3:32
要 (Yao) - I Wanna - 3:43
無神論 (Wu Shen Lun) - Atheist Like Me - 3:17
禮物 (Li Wu) - The Gift - 4:27
彩虹的軌道 (Cai Hong De Gu Dao) - Chasing Rainbows - 3:46
老師說 (Lao Shi Shuo) - Check Yourself - 3:20
脫離 (Tuo Li) - I Gotta Go - 2:57
小姑娘 (Xiao Gu Niang) - Country Girl - 3:51
大人們 (Da Ren Men) - A Child's View - 4:05
一人世界 (Yi Ren Shi Jie) - Selfishness - 3:04
乖乖牌 (Guai Guai Pai) - Nice Guy feat. Jolin Tsai - 3:17
無神論(英文版) (Wu Shen Lun (Ying Wen Ban)) - Atheist Like Me (English Version) - 3:17
未來 (Wei Lai) - Into The Future - 3:39

Releases
Two editions were released by EMI Music Taiwan:
 5 January 2007 - Atheist Like Me (CD)
 2 March 2007 - Atheist Like Me (Second Version) (CD+DVD) (無神論 影音慶功版) (CD+DVD) - includes 4 MV's and 2007 Stanley Huang 「Atheist Like Me」 Intel Core Duo Live Tour (黃立行「無神論」Intel雙核飛舞Live Tour精華)

Bonus DVD
Atheist Like Me (Second Version)
 Chapter 1 - 「Atheist Like Me」 Intel Core Duo Live Tour
 "無神論(中文版)" - Atheist Like Me(Chinese Version)
 "要" - I Wanna
 "打分數" - What Number Are You?
 "乖乖牌" - Nice Guy
 "脫離" - I Gotta Go
 "禮物" - The Gift

 Chapter 2 - 「Atheist Like Me」 Album Music Video
 "無神論(中文版)" - Atheist Like Me(Chinese Version) MV
 "打分數" - What Number Are You? MV
 "禮物" - The Gift MV
 "未來" - Into The Future MV

References

External links
  Stanley Huang - Atheist Like Me@Gold Typhoon Official Website formerly EMI Music Taiwan (2006–2008)

2007 albums
Stanley Huang albums